McKimmie is a surname. Notable people with the surname include:

Jackie McKimmie (born 1950), Australian writer and director
Stewart McKimmie (born 1962), Scottish footballer